Pachpaika is a small village in the Vaishali district of Bihar, India. It is located about 12 km away from the heritage place Vaishali in Bihar. The village has a population of about 1,000. The population of Pachpaika is mainly dependent upon agriculture to survive. There is a primary school in the village and education is available up to 5th standard. Post office of this village is located at near by village Pauni Hasanpur. PIN code is 844123.

Pachpaika is close to Panchayat, Hajipur and Lalganj.

See also
 List of villages in Vaishali district

Villages in Vaishali district